Panama, formerly named Rio Bravo after the Spanish name for the Kern River, Rio Bravo de San Felipe, is an unincorporated community in Kern County, California.

A post office operated at Panama from 1874 to 1876.

References

Unincorporated communities in Kern County, California
Unincorporated communities in California